Döhlen is may refer to the municipal subdivisions:

Döhlen (Freital), Freital (Saxony, Germany)
Döhlen (Markranstädt), Markranstädt (Saxony, Germany)
Döhlen (Seelitz), Seelitz (Saxony, Germany)

See also
Göhren-Döhlen
Von Dohlen